Holland is the 19th studio album by American rock band the Beach Boys, released January 8, 1973 on Brother/Reprise. It is their first album recorded without Bruce Johnston since 1965, their second with Blondie Chaplin and Ricky Fataar, and their final studio album created under the de facto leadership of Carl Wilson and manager Jack Rieley. The LP was originally packaged with a bonus EP, Mount Vernon and Fairway, which consisted of a 12-minute fairy tale written and produced by Brian and Carl Wilson.

Per its title, Holland was recorded over the summer of 1972 at a barn in Baambrugge, near Amsterdam, where the band members and their entourage had decamped for several months in the pursuit of creative inspiration. Recording the album was an unprecedented and extremely costly venture, as the group had commissioned their engineers to renovate the barn, which had housed an existing studio, using components from the band's studio in Los Angeles that were dismantled, shipped to Holland in crates, and then reassembled. Ultimately, only the album's basic tracks were recorded in Holland, with the band finishing off the record in late 1972 at Village Recorders in Los Angeles. Total expenses were estimated at $250,000 (equivalent to $ in ).

Holland received generally favorable reviews and came to be viewed by many fans as the Beach Boys' last great album. It peaked at number 36 in the US and number 20 in the UK, and it produced two singles: "Sail On, Sailor" and "California Saga/California". Subsequently, the band recorded little in the studio for the next two years. Instead, they released the live album The Beach Boys in Concert (1973), and did not follow up with another studio album until 15 Big Ones (1976).  In 2022, an expanded version of Holland was packaged within the compilation Sail On Sailor – 1972.

Background

In late December 1970, the Beach Boys played three concert dates in Amsterdam as part of a short European tour. On the first date, which had been scheduled to begin at 12:30 a.m., the band arrived four hours late due to a missed flight, and were surprised to find that the concert hall venue, the Concertgebouw, was still packed with attendees. Furthermore, the audience shouted for the group to perform their new songs, rather than their past hits. Carl Wilson told a local magazine, "I love this audience. Our last albums [20/20 and Sunflower] sold poorly in the US, our financial situation is disastrous – and here we have success. I like this country."

Reports from this period suggested that the group were planning to move from Los Angeles to Britain once their recording commitments were finished. In one report, manager Jack Rieley said they were "definitely leaving Los Angeles because of the smog." Later, Rieley told Rolling Stone, "I wanted to [shift our base] and so did Carl. [Holland] seemed like an interesting place. But most importantly, I felt that The Beach Boys had to do a record outside of California, to get away from that whole scene, find a new scene, and create in that new scene."

During the recording of Carl and the Passions – "So Tough", in late February 1972, the band returned to the Netherlands to film a promotional clip for their forthcoming single, "Marcella", and play a televised concert at the RAI Congrescentrum. There, the group decided on the Netherlands as the venue for their next recording project, and where they would set up headquarters for the next several months. A few days later, the band announced drummer Ricky Fataar and guitarist Blondie Chaplin as new additions to their official line-up. 1965 addition Bruce Johnston resigned from the group in April 1972.

The band had expected to record their Netherlands-based album at a local studio, however, the country's few studios were already overbooked. To get around this, the group commissioned their engineer, Steve Moffit, to design and construct a portable mixing desk – something which had never been done before – and have it shipped to their Netherlands base. This meant dismantling the band's private studio located in Brian Wilson's home. Later, at the end of May, Moffit discovered a barn in Baambrugge, within 10 miles of Amsterdam, that housed an existing recording studio, which he then converted for the band's own purposes. The group also tasked their publicist, Bill DeSimone, with finding eleven houses for the Beach Boys' entourage, unaware that the Netherlands had suffered from a chronic housing shortage. After two weeks, he successfully secured four houses for the group. From May 5 to June 3, the group toured Europe and the UK while using their new homes and offices around Amsterdam as a base.

Members of the group and their entourage – which included several wives, girlfriends, and relatives; Rieley and his dog; engineers Moffitt, Gordon Rudd, and Jon Parks; assistant Russ Mackie, and secretary Carol Hess and her husband – took residence at various locations within a 30-mile radius of central Amsterdam. Carl and Chaplin lived in Hilversum; Fataar lived in Vreeland; and Mike Love and Al Jardine lived in Bloemendaal. Brian, who had long resisted making the trip, ultimately settled in Laren with his wife Marilyn, their two children Carnie and Wendy, Marilyn's sister Diane Rovell, and a housekeeper. It took three attempts for Brian to successfully get on the flight from Los Angeles to Amsterdam.

Production

The sessions in Holland lasted from June 3 to August 15, 1972 at the BBC 2 Baambrugge studio near Amsterdam. Initially, the studio was in a non-functioning state, as there was not enough time to test the equipment shipped from Los Angeles before the group were due to record. According to biographer Steven Gaines, Moffit "spent eighteen hours a day for the next four and a half weeks trying to get the equipment running. This ruined the touring schedule the Beach Boys expected to keep in Europe, severely limiting the needed income to cover the expense of living in Holland." Al Jardine remembered, "It was rough being in Holland. We were working 24/7 in a small homemade rebuilt piecemeal little studio in a garage next to a cow pasture. Yeah, it was rough. We didn’t even have the correct electricity [...] so that kind of affected the sound of our equipment. It was a mixed blessing."

According to Fataar, "Everybody would come in with a piece of a song or a completed song and kind of play around with it and then figure out how we wanted to record it. It was very casual." Carl produced every track on Holland, except for the songs by Dennis Wilson, which Dennis produced himself. In the middle of recording, Dennis moved to the Canary Islands, opting to return to the studio only for certain sessions. Biographer Jon Stebbins explains that Dennis had not felt "comfortable living in Holland".

Brian did not join most of his bandmate's sessions, instead preferring to work alone on late nights. Fataar said, "I can't even remember seeing him in the studio in Holland. Everyone had their own family situation and we'd just go to work and occasionally see each other. It wasn't like a one-big-family thing." Carl recalled, "It was a very creative time for me. Brian had me working on the album very hard so he could have some time for himself. He wasn't really up for doing much, as far as going into the studio every day." Biographer Peter Ames Carlin writes,

At the end of the Holland stay, in early August, the band attended a party hosted by the Dutch record company Bovema Negram, where Rieley announced to local journalists that the Beach Boys' next release would be a double album titled Holland. However, only the album's basic tracks were recorded in Holland; the band subsequently returned to California for further recording. Rieley stayed behind, intending from this point onward to manage the group from his office in Amsterdam. 

From late September through early October, the band refined the tracks at Village Recorders in Los Angeles, and a master was assembled on October 9. It was expected that the album would be released on November 5, but this motion was halted by Reprise/Warner Bros. executives who felt that the LP was a weak effort and lacked a hit single. The band were displeased; Gaines quoted one Warner Bros. executive as saying, "It was bloodshed. Everybody went wild." To satisfy the record company, the group recorded one more song, "Sail On, Sailor", after which the album was remastered and completed in late November. Production expenses for Holland totaled $250,000 (equivalent to $ in ). Rieley remarked of the exorbitant cost, "Someday accounting will face a column just titled 'Holland.'"

Songs

Side one

"Sail On, Sailor" was written primarily by Van Dyke Parks and Brian Wilson with Rieley, Tandyn Almer, and Ray Kennedy. There are several contradicting accounts of the song's origins. Carlin states that the song was essentially co-written by Wilson and Parks in 1971, with Kennedy and Almer's contributions dating from impromptu sessions at Three Dog Night singer Danny Hutton's house during the epoch. Brian refused to participate on the recording.

"Steamboat" was written by Dennis and Rieley, and sung by Carl. The lyrics reference Robert Fulton, the inventor of the steamboat. Carlin described the song as "a dreamlike journey back to the mythic heart of Mark Twain's America, borne by the insistent chug of an actual steam engine, hurtling keyboard glissandos, and a wonderfully bluesy slide guitar break". Musician Scott McCaughey wrote, "the chugging, almost industrial rhythm bed sounds like a modern sampled tape loop or a latter-day Tom Waits creation."

"California Saga" is a three-part series of songs – "Big Sur", "The Beaks of Eagles", and "California" – that the members of the group produced when they had been feeling homesick. "Big Sur", an acoustic number about rural life in Northern California, is the first song in which Mike Love wrote both the words and music. It was originally recorded during the Surf's Up sessions; the version on Holland is a rerecording. "The Beaks of Eagles", composed by Jardine, is partly based on Robinson Jeffers' poem of the same name. "California" has Brian, who was otherwise barely present at the group's sessions, singing the opening line "On my way to sunny Californ-i-a".

Side two
"The Trader" is a two-part composition by Carl, with lyrics by Rieley, who explained, "Carl was speaking out about the fact that it’s wrong to subjugate a people, as so many have been. The Trader is really about racism; these people who got their orders from the king or queen and colonised Africa, for example. The tender part of the song asks the Africans to reply. I believe it’s quite touching. I wasn’t consciously trying to do something political." According to Carlin, the lyrics explore "Manifest Destiny as seen through the eyes of the conquering and the conquered."

"Leaving This Town" was written primarily by Fataar, who said, "I had parts of it and Carl came in the studio and suggested other things, so we were just making it up as we went along." "Only with You" was composed by Dennis, with words by Mike Love, and sung by Carl. "Funky Pretty" was produced by Carl and Brian, and features every member of the group trading the lead vocal.

Leftover
Among the outtakes, "We Got Love" is an anti-apartheid song by Blondie Chaplin, Fataar, and Love that was dropped from the album's track listing to make way for "Sail On, Sailor". A live recording of "We Got Love" was included on the album The Beach Boys In Concert (1973). "Hard Times" (not to be confused with "Hard Time") was written by Chaplin and recorded on October 4   "Pa, Let Her Go Out", written by Brian, evolved into "Better Get Back in Bed", "Little Children (Daddy Dear)" and "Lazy Lizzie". All the songs listed were released on the Sail On Sailor – 1972  box set besides for "Lazy Lizzie" which remains unreleased to this day. 

"Carry Me Home" was written by Dennis, who shared the lead vocal with Chaplin. Stebbins refers to the song as "the most expressive of emotional pain" of any Beach Boys songs. Dennis explained to an interviewer, "I wrote a song intended for Holland about Vietnam. I got the image of a soldier—me—dying in a ditch, and I ended up doing a song about it. The soldier began feeling, 'Why the hell am I here?' Then the coldness started move up his body, from his feet to his legs, to his chest ... until he was dead. See? It was too negative! How could I put that on a Beach Boys album?" The song would have been released on the 2013 box set Made in California had there not already been a large number of Dennis songs on the compilation.  Brother Records archive manager Alan Boyd said, "We also felt a little uncomfortable with the idea of at this point in time of Dennis singing (recites lyrics), 'Please God don’t let me die'." The song eventually was released fifty years after being recorded, as a teaser single for the Sail On, Sailor boxset, which it was also included in.

Packaging and bonus disc

The front cover depicts (upside down) a tugboat in the Kromme Waal, a canal in central Amsterdam. Holland was packaged with a 12-page booklet that provided a historical overview of the album's making, plus a bonus EP, Mount Vernon and Fairway, that Brian and Carl had produced during the Holland sessions. The EP represented a compromise, as Brian had wanted Mount Vernon and Fairway featured on the album, a proposal that his bandmates had vetoed.

Release
Released on January 8, 1973, Holland peaked at number 36 in the U.S. and number 20 in the UK. Despite having a lower chart showing, the record outsold Carl and the Passions. Lead single "Sail On, Sailor" (backed with "Only with You") was issued in February and reached number 79. In the UK, the lead single was "California Saga/California" (backed with "Sail On, Sailor"), reaching number 75. In March, the band remixed and overdubbed new vocals onto "California Saga/California" for a U.S. single release. Released in May, the single (backed with "Funky Pretty") reached number 84.

From March 7 to May 17, the Beach Boys embarked on a ten-week U.S. tour with a supporting band that included guitarist Billy Hinsche, keyboardist Carlos Munoz, drummer Joe Pollard, bassist Ed Carter, and percussionist Richard "Didymus" Washington. Their set list included "Funky Pretty", "Leaving This Town", "California Saga/California", and "Sail On, Sailor". According to music historian Keith Badman, critics noted "some unusually long pauses between each song and the group's sometimes negative reaction to any audience requests for oldies." Brian Wilson, who last appeared with his bandmates in concert in 1970, briefly joined them onstage during their encore at the Hollywood Palladium on April 20.

Over the next two years, the group maintained a touring regimen, but recorded very little in the studio. On November 19, Warner/Reprise issued The Beach Boys in Concert, a live double album that became the band's best-selling release on the label. It included live performances of "Sail On, Sailor", "The Trader", "Leaving This Town",  "Funky Pretty", and the Holland outtake "We Got Love".

Critical reception

Contemporary

Holland received generally favorable reviews at the time of release. Rolling Stones Jim Miller, who was displeased with Carl and the Passions, praised Holland for its "occasionally unnerving simplicity of viewpoint [and] its frequently ornate perfection." The magazine later ranked it among the five best albums of 1973. Robert Christgau of The Village Voice praised the sound quality of Holland, but believed that the album had strayed too far from what the Beach Boys did best, stating, "I suppose that in time their tongue-tied travelogue of Big Sur may seem no more escapist than 'Fun Fun Fun', but who'll ever believe it's equally simple, direct, or innocent?" In Britain, NMEs Richard Williams wrote, "I expect more from the Beach Boys than from anyone else. Holland has the goods."

Retrospective

Holland became regarded by many fans as the Beach Boys' "last, high-quality original album". Music journalist Peter Doggett opined, "After the false start of Carl And The Passions, Holland proved that the Beach Boys could function as a creative rock band beyond the self-imposed limits of their 60s hits." Mojos Danny Ecleston referred to Holland as his favorite Beach Boys album, as well as their "least-heard (and certainly last) great record."

The album has been included in some opinion polls and rankings.
 In 1999, it was ranked number 21 in The Guardians list of the "Top 100 Albums That Don't Appear in All the Other Top 100 Albums of All Time".
 In 2000, it was voted number 648 in the third edition of Colin Larkin's All Time Top 1000 Albums.
 In 2007, it was ranked number 100 in OOR Magazines list of the "100 Best Albums of All Time".

Less favorably, AllMusic reviewer John Bush rued that Holland was a "surprisingly weak" effort. Douglas Wolk of Blender thought that the band "got way self-indulgent, recording poetry, flutes and Moog solos." Among biographers, Stebbins called the record "a very respectable effort", though "not of the caliber of Pet Sounds or Sunflower". John Tobler praised the "California Saga" trilogy and "The Trader", but decreed, "some of the [other] tracks were less than exceptional".

Brian's 2016 memoir, I Am Brian Wilson, states of Holland: "There are some great songs on that record. 'Steamboat' kicks ass. I really like 'Only with You' and 'Funky Pretty', too. It's a damned good album no matter where or how we made it."

Influence
Elvis Costello ranked the album as one of his favorite records of all time.  Tom Petty penned liner notes for the 2000 CD reissue, in which he described the album as "beautiful" and singled out "The Trader" as the album's "centerpiece". Primal Scream covered the Holland outtake "Carry Me Home". Camper Van Beethoven stated that Holland was an enormous inspiration on their 2013 album  La Costa Perdida.

Track listing

Personnel
Credits from Craig Slowinski, John Brode, Will Crerar and Joshilyn Hoisington. Track numbering refers to CD and digital releases of the album.

The Beach Boys
Blondie Chaplin – lead (1, 7, 9), backing (1, 7), and round vocals (9), bass (1, 3-4, 7-8) and electric guitars (5)
Ricky Fataar – backing vocals (1-2, 7); drums (all tracks except 9), congas (7); pedal steel guitar (3, 5, 8); Hammond organ (7), ARP Odyssey (7); producer (7)
Alan Jardine – lead (4, 9), harmony (5) and backing vocals (3-5, 8), narration (4); acoustic (3-4) and electric guitars (5), banjos (5); producer (3-5)
Mike Love – lead (3, 5, 9), harmony (3, 5), backing (1, 3-4, 7-8), and round vocals (9), narration (4)
Brian Wilson – backing (6, 9) and intro vocals (5); upright piano (9), Moog synthesizers (9); drums (9), congas (9); co-arranger (1), vocal arrangement (6); producer (9)
Carl Wilson – lead (2, 6, 8-9), harmony (2-3, 5, 8), backing (all tracks except 4 and 7), round (9), and response vocals (1); acoustic (2) and electric guitars (1, 6, 8-9); grand (5) and upright pianos (3-4, 6-7), Wurlitzer electric piano (1, 6-8), Hammond organ (1, 4-6), ARP Odyssey (1) and Moog synthesizers (5-6); vocal arrangement (6); producer (1-2, 6, 9)
Dennis Wilson – harmony (2) and backing vocals (2, 8); clavinet (2), Wurlitzer electric piano (2), celeste (2), Moog synthesizers (2), upright piano (8); producer (2, 8)

Touring musicians

 Billy Hinsche – backing vocals (9)

Additional musicians

 Gerry Beckley – backing vocals (1, 7)
 Jack Rieley – backing vocals (2)
 Marilyn Wilson – backing vocals (4, 6, 9)
 Diane Rovell – backing vocals (4, 9)
 Bruce Johnston – backing vocals (5)
 Jonah Wilson – intro voice (6)
 Kevin Michaels – tambourine (1), sleigh bells (6)
 Tony Martin, Jr. – pedal steel guitar (2)
 Charles Lloyd – flute (4-5)
 Frank Mayes – baritone saxophone (5), horn arrangement (5)
 Rogier van Otterloo – string arrangement (8)
 Unknown musicians – Hammond organ (2), ARP Odyssey (2), water chimes (2), diatonic harmonica (3-5); 2 violins (8), viola (8), cello (8)

Technical and production staff
Stephen Moffitt – engineer (all tracks except 7); co-engineer (1)
Rob Fraboni – engineer (7); co-engineer (1)
Jon Parks – second engineer (all tracks)
United Visuals (Amsterdam) – layout
Russ Mackie – album photography, art

Charts

Notes

References

Bibliography

External links

 Holland on YouTube
 
 

The Beach Boys albums
1973 albums
Reprise Records albums
Brother Records albums
Albums produced by the Beach Boys